Tosena fasciata is a cicada species from Southeast Asia that has been recorded from Sumatra, Java, Borneo and Ambon Island

References

Insects described in 1787
Insects of Borneo
Taxa named by Johan Christian Fabricius
Tosenini